Jinx is a Croatian pop band from Zagreb which was formed in 1993.

They began their career under the name "High Jinx" coming from a concert in a Zagreb nightclub Saloon.

The members of Jinx are guitarist Coco Mosquito, vocalist Jadranka Bastajić Yaya, drummer Berko Muratović, keyboardist Mr. Goody, trumpet player Igor Pavlica and bassist Adam Matijašević. Former members of the band are Goony, Kiky the Kid, bassist Samir Kadribasic, trumpet player Rudi and saxophone player Jordes.

The prefix "High" was dropped in 1995, since all fans who attended their first gigs referred to them solely as Jinx. Their first album, Sextasy, was released in English. However, during serving the mandatory military service in 1996, Mosquito started writing first songs in Croatian. Berko and Samir  joined the band in 1996. In 1997, Jinx signed their first record contract with Aquarius Records and released their second album called Second Hand. In 2001, Percussionist Boris Popov joined the band.

Jinx disbanded in 2002 and made a comeback in 2007 with the album Na zapadu (In the West), having signed with Dallas Records.

In 2017, Jinx released an album called "Pogrebi i Pomiriši" (Scratch and Smell). One of the songs, "Maradona", features Psihomodo Pop singer Davor Gobac.

Discography

Albums
 Sextasy (1995; re-released in 2000)
 Second Hand (1997)
 Pompei – Ljetna ploča katastrofe (1999)
 Avantura počinje (2001)
 Na zapadu (2007)
 Diksilend (2010)
 Pogrebi & pomiriši (2017)

Live albums
 Live (2008)

Compilations
 Best of Jinx Retro (2002)
 Retro Plus (2007)
 Sextazsy/Second Hand (2010)

Singles
 Smijem se (1997)
 Bye bye baby bye (1999)
 Koliko suza (1999)
 Tamo gdje je sve po mom (2001)
 Na čemu si ti (2007)
 Jesmo li dobro? (2016)

Awards
 1998 – Radio France International, Bucharest, best new artist
 2002 – Porin Award, Hit of the Year
 2011 – Porin Award, Best Pop Album

References

External links
 Official MySpace
 Official Facebook

Croatian pop music groups
Musical groups established in 1994
Hayat Production artists
1994 establishments in Croatia